Beja Airport is a Portuguese airport that opened doors to civilian flights on April 15, 2011.

Location
Beja is a city in the Beja Municipality in the Alentejo Region, Portugal. The city proper has a population of 21,658.

History
An airbase was established on 21 October 1964, originally built to serve as a training facility for the West German Air Force, due to airspace limitations within West Germany. Until 1993, it was used particularly for weapons training, and in 1987 the Portuguese Air Force's 103 Squadron and its Lockheed T-33 and Northrop T-38 aircraft was relocated from Montijo. After their arrival, the base started to host a mixed array of fixed and rotary-wing trainers, as well as maritime patrol aircraft.

Along with the airports in Lisbon, Porto, Faro, Funchal (Madeira), Porto Santo, Flores, Santa Maria, Ponta Delgada and Horta, the airport's concessions to provide support to civil aviation was conceded to ANA Aeroportos de Portugal on 18 December 1998, under provisions of decree 404/98. With this concession, ANA was also provided to the planning, development and construction of future infrastructures.

In 2011, a new civilian terminal was built and Beja became a dual-use military-civilian airport, aiming to attract low-cost carriers. The inaugural flight to Praia, Cape Verde, took place on 13 April 2011. There were also charter flights to the United Kingdom.

In spite of being the only Portuguese airport in Alentejo—the biggest Portuguese region, with an area comparable to the size of Belgium—the airport failed to attract the attention of low-cost carriers and has never had any scheduled regular flights. As of September 2012, plans to reconvert it into cargo use are under discussion. It may possibly be a logistics platform between the goods that are shipped to the nearby Port of Sines and the whole of Europe.

In September 2013, it was announced that Aigle Azur would start seasonal flights from Paris to Beja but the airline filed for bankruptcy and was placed in receivership on 2 September 2019. As of September 2012, the future of the airport remains uncertain. The authorities are studying the possibility of reconverting the airport to cargo use.

While the airport has no scheduled passenger flights, it is used by Hi Fly and its Maltese subsidiary for parking aircraft. A related sister company is also building a new hangar at the airport for the maintenance of both Hi Fly planes and third-party Airbus aircraft, supplementing its operations at Humberto Delgado Airport.

See also
Transport in Portugal
List of airports in Portugal

References

External links

 Official website
 Space Shuttle abort modes#Emergency landing sites

Airports in Portugal
Buildings and structures in Beja, Portugal